The 1985 FIVB Women's U20 World Championship was held in many Italian cities from September 12 to 22, 1985. 15 teams participated in the tournament.

Qualification
A total of 15 teams qualified for the final tournament. In addition to Italy, who qualified automatically as the hosts, another 14 teams qualified via four separate continental tournament.

 * Australia replaced Chinese Taipei.
 ** Colombia declined to participate.

Pools composition

Preliminary round

Pool A

|}

|}

Pool B

|}

|}

Pool C

|}

|}

Pool D

|}

|}

Second round

Pool E

|}

|}

Pool F

|}

|}

13th–15th places

|}

|}

Final round

9th–12th places

Classification 9th and 12th

|}

Classification 11th

|}

Classification 9th

|}

5th–8th places

Classification 5th and 8th

|}

Classification 7th

|}

Classification 5th

|}

Championship round

Semifinals

|}

Bronze medal match

|}

Gold medal match

|}

Final standing

Individual awards

MVP:  Mireya Luis

External links
 Informational website.

World Championship
Volleyball
FIVB Volleyball Women's U20 World Championship
FIVB
1985 in youth sport